Turner Memorial Hospital is a community hospital in Keith, Morayshire, Scotland. It is administered by NHS Grampian.

History 
The hospital was financed by public subscription on the initiative of a Mr William Longmore. It was officially opened as the "Turner Memorial Hospital" in memory of Dr Robert Turner in 1880. It was expanded with the addition of two new wards in 1893 and further extended in 1926 and 1992.

Services
The hospital has 22 beds providing for acute care, palliative care, rehabilitation and assessment and also a 24-hour minor injury unit.
The hospital had links with Keith Community Radio which first broadcast in 1986.

References 

NHS Grampian
NHS Scotland hospitals
Hospital buildings completed in 1880
Hospital buildings completed in 1893
Hospitals in Moray
Keith, Moray